CRTT may refer to:
Certified Respiratory Therapist
Creation theory